Michael Neely Bryan (August 9, 1916 – August 20, 1972) was an American jazz guitarist.

Biography
Bryan was a self-taught guitarist born in Byhalia, Mississippi on August 9, 1916. Bryan is best known for his time playing with Benny Goodman and his contribution to a series of television documentaries sponsored by the Goodyear Tire Company featuring jazz musicians. He began his career playing in the Memphis area until 1935 when he joined Red Nichols in Chicago. After that, he led his own band in Greenwood, Mississippi from 1938 to 1939. From November 1940 until May 1941, Bryan worked with Benny Goodman and played with the big bands of Bob Chester, Jan Savitt, and Artie Shaw until he joined the United States Army from March 1942 until November 1944.

In December 1942, author Ursula Parrott became the subject of national coverage when she was brought up on federal charges of attempting to help Bryan escape from the Miami Beach Army stockade. However, she was acquitted by the jury at her trial.

After his time in the military, Bryan worked with some emerging bebop musicians like Dizzy Gillespie and Charlie Parker in their small groups. He rejoined Benny Goodman from January 1945 until September 1946 and recorded with both the sextet and the orchestra. Bryan spent several years doing studio work in California. In addition he produced a series of foreign television documentaries for the Goodyear Tire Company featuring jazz musicians such as Louis Armstrong and Duke Ellington.

In 1962, he toured Europe as music director of a band also sponsored by Goodyear. In 1966, he toured Vietnam with Martha Raye. On 5 May 1957 he married Lady Iris Mountbatten, only child of Alexander Mountbatten, 1st Marquess of Carisbrooke and a great-granddaughter of Queen Victoria. They divorced months later. He died of leukemia in 1972.

Bibliography
 Chilton, John (1985). Who's Who of Jazz: Storyville to Swing Street. New York NY, Da Capo Press.
 Claghorn, Charles Eugene (1982). Biographical Dictionary of Jazz. Englewood Cliffs NJ, Prentice-Hall, Inc: 53.
 Feather, Leonard and Gitler, Ira (1999). The Biographical Encyclopedia of Jazz. New York NY, Oxford University Press: 90.
 Kernfeld, Barry (2002). The New Grove Dictionary of Jazz. Taunton MA, Macmillan Publishers Limited. 1:336.
 Larkin, Colin (1999). The Virgin Encyclopedia of Jazz. London, Virgin Books: 131–132.

References

Swing guitarists
American jazz guitarists
Deaths from cancer in California
Deaths from leukemia
1916 births
1972 deaths
20th-century American guitarists
People from Byhalia, Mississippi
People from Greenwood, Mississippi
Jazz musicians from Mississippi
United States Army personnel of World War II